Juliet Escoria is an American writer. She was born in Australia, raised in San Diego, and lives in West Virginia with her husband, the writer and martial artist Scott McClanahan.

She published a collection of stories with accompanying videos titled Black Cloud (2014). Black Cloud received positive reviews at Flavorwire, Bullet Magazine  and Volume 1 Brooklyn  It was mentioned in the lists of best books of 2014 at The Fader, Salon, and Flavorwire.

Escoria’s work has appeared in publications such as Electric Literature, Hobart, VICE The Believer, and Guernica. Escoria holds an MFA in Fiction Writing from Brooklyn College.

Escoria also created companion videos to accompany the stories in Black Cloud.

Bibliography
Black Cloud (2014, Civil Coping Mechanisms)
Witch Babies (2015, Holler Presents)
Witch Hunt (2016, Lazy Fascist)
Juliet the Maniac (2019, Melville House)

References

External links 

 Official site
 Official Twitter page
 Black Cloud by Juliet Escoria

 VICE magazine interview
 DAZED best-of 2014 list
 Hobart interview

1982 births
American women short story writers
Living people
21st-century American short story writers
21st-century American women writers
Australian emigrants to the United States
Writers from San Diego
Writers from West Virginia
Brooklyn College alumni